Jaroszki may refer to the following places in Poland:
Jaroszki, Łódź Voivodeship (central Poland)
Jaroszki, Masovian Voivodeship (east-central Poland)